Helen Broderick (August 11, 1891 – September 25, 1959) was an American actress known for her comic roles, especially as a wisecracking sidekick.

Career

Broderick began on Broadway as a chorus girl in the Follies of 1907, the first of Florenz Ziegfeld's annual revues. She went on to perform in the vaudeville duo "Broderick & Crawford" (with her husband) until the entertainment form went out of style, moving to a solo career in her first play Nifties of 23. By the late 1920s, she was playing leads and featured roles, most notably in Fifty Million Frenchmen. In the early 1930s, she starred in the revues The Band Wagon and As Thousands Cheer. Her move to Hollywood came when her stage successes such as Fifty Million Frenchmen were made into movies, and an image as the quick-quipping friend soon followed in support roles for the Astaire-Rogers movies Top Hat and Swing Time. She had leading roles in a few B movies, such as amateur sleuth Hildegarde Withers in Murder on a Bridle Path.

The wife of actor Lester (Pendergast) Crawford (they appear together in the 1930 eight-minute Nile Green, and two 1931 seven-minute comedy shorts: The Spirits of 76th Street and Court Plastered), they were the parents of Academy Award-winning actor Broderick Crawford (1911–1986).

Broderick's last appearance on film was with Deanna Durbin in the comedy Because of Him (1946).

Death
Broderick died after a stroke at the age of 68 on September 25, 1959. Her husband died in November 1962.

Complete filmography

 High Speed (1924) - Minor Role
 The Mystery Club (1926)
 Nile Green (1930 short)
 For Art's Sake (1930, Short)
 Court Plastered (1931, Short) - Helen Smith
 50 Million Frenchmen (1931) - Violet
 The Spirits of 76th Street (1931, Short)
 Cold Turkey (1931, Short)
 Top Hat (1935) - Madge Hardwick
 To Beat the Band (1935) - Mrs. Freeda McCrary
 Love on a Bet (1936) - Aunt Charlotte
 Murder on a Bridle Path (1936) - Hildegarde Withers
 The Bride Walks Out (1936) - Mattie Dodson
 Swing Time (1936) - Mabel Anderson
 Smartest Girl in Town (1936) - Mrs. Gwen Mayen
 We're on the Jury (1937) - Mrs. Agnes Dean, aka Mrs. Jonathan Ashley Dean
 Meet the Missus (1937) - Emma Foster - Mrs. Mid-Western
 The Life of the Party (1937) - Pauline
 She's Got Everything (1937) - Aunt Jane Carter
 Radio City Revels (1938) - Gertie Shaw
 The Rage of Paris (1938) - Gloria Patterson
 The Road to Reno (1938) - Aunt Minerva
 Service de Luxe (1938) - Pearl
 Stand Up and Fight (1939) - Amanda Griffith
 Naughty but Nice (1939) - Aunt Martha Hogan
 Honeymoon in Bali (1939) - Miss Lorna 'Smitty' Smith
 The Captain Is a Lady (1940) - Nancy Crocker
 No, No, Nanette (1940) - Mrs. Susan Smith
 Virginia (1941) - Theo Clairmont
 Nice Girl? (1941) - Cora Foster
 Father Takes a Wife (1941) - Aunt Julie
 Picture People No. 3: Hobbies of the Stars (1941, Short) - Narrator
 Stage Door Canteen (1943) - Helen Broderick
 Chip Off the Old Block (1944) - Glory Marlow Sr.
 Her Primitive Man (1944) - Mrs. Winthrop
 Three Is a Family (1944) - Irma
 Love, Honor and Goodbye (1945) - Mary Riley
 Because of Him (1946) - Nora (final film role)

References

External links
 

1891 births
1959 deaths
American film actresses
American stage actresses
Vaudeville performers
20th-century American actresses